Marija Šestak (born Martinović, Мартиновић) is a Serbian-born Slovenian triple jumper.

Marija Martinović was born on 17 April 1979 in Kragujevac (at the time SR Serbia, SFR Yugoslavia). She is married to Slovenian 400 metres runner Matija Šestak. She was granted Slovenian citizenship on 13 July 2006.

Her personal best jump is 15.08 metres, achieved on 13 February 2008 in Athens. This is the current national record for Slovenia, beating the seven-year-old record of Anja Valant.  She also has 6.50 metres in the long jump.

Achievements

References

 

1979 births
Living people
Slovenian female triple jumpers
Serbian female triple jumpers
Athletes (track and field) at the 2000 Summer Olympics
Athletes (track and field) at the 2008 Summer Olympics
Athletes (track and field) at the 2012 Summer Olympics
Olympic athletes of Slovenia
Olympic athletes of Yugoslavia
Sportspeople from Kragujevac
Slovenian people of Serbian descent
World Athletics Championships athletes for Slovenia
Mediterranean Games silver medalists for Yugoslavia
Athletes (track and field) at the 2001 Mediterranean Games
Mediterranean Games medalists in athletics
Competitors at the 1997 Summer Universiade
Competitors at the 2003 Summer Universiade